Ünloco is an American nu metal band formed in Austin, Texas.

History
Ünloco was formed in 2000 by frontman vocalist Joey Dueñas, with Pete Navarrete on drums, Victor Escareño on bass, and Brian Arthur on guitar. That same year, the band released a six-track EP titled Useless through Captiva Records.

The band was signed by Madonna's Maverick label and on March 20, 2001, Ünloco released their debut album Healing produced by Johnny K. The album struggled to sell, and the band's future with their label was uncertain.

Soon after, guitarist Brian Arthur left to join Goldfinger, and was replaced by Marc Serrano. From October to November 2002, Ünloco co-headlined an American tour with Kittie; Clockwise and Acacia supported.

Their second effort, Becoming i, was released on March 11, 2003, and was produced by Andrew Murdock – responsible for Powerman 5000, Godsmack, and Chimaira, among other artists. During said year, the band toured with Korn, opened for Music as a Weapon II, and appeared at Ozzfest 2003. Despite the push from their label, Becoming i failed to meet expectations, and the band split up that same year.

Since then, guitarist Marc Serrano joined the now disbanded A Dozen Furies, drummer Pete Navarrete formed a band called Exit the Sun, and vocalist Joey Dueñas formed a band called Anew Revolution, featuring members from Slaves on Dope. The band released a five-track self-released EP in 2005. They also released Rise in 2008 and iMERICA in 2010.

In July 2014, Ünloco announced a reunion show in Austin, Texas. On September 20, 2014, they played at the Dirty Dog Bar with guitarist Kash Sarkaria and bassist Mando Ayala. On March 14, 2017, Ünloco played a SXSW show at Grizzly Hall in Austin, Texas.

Members
Last line-up
 Joey Dueñas – vocals (2000–2003, 2014–present)
 Pete Navarrete – drums (2000–2003, 2014–present)
 Mando Ayala – guitar (2014–present)
 Jorge Dueñas – bass (2015–present)

Former
 Victor Escareño – bass (2000–2003)
 Marc Serrano – guitar (2001–2003)
 Brian Arthur – guitar (2000–2001)
 Ben Benavides – guitar

Discography

EPs
 Useless (2000)

Albums

Singles
 Healing
 "Face Down"
 Becoming i
 "Failure" [US Billboard Mainstream Rock Tracks #25]
 "Empty"

Soundtracks appearances
 "Nothing" – used in Little Nicky
 "Bruises" – used in The Matrix Reloaded
 "Bruises" – used in Music as a Weapon II
 "Bruises" – used in True Crime: Streets of LA
 "Crashing" – used in Madden 2004
 "Empty" – used in Music as a Weapon II

References

External links
 
 Anew Revolution: MySpace site

2000 establishments in Texas
American alternative metal musical groups
American nu metal musical groups
Heavy metal musical groups from Texas
Musical groups from Austin, Texas
Musical groups established in 2000